The Kosovo Specialist Chambers and Specialist Prosecutor's Office (KSC & SPO) is a court of Kosovo, located in The Hague (Netherlands), hosting four Specialist Chambers and the Specialist Prosecutors Office, which may perform their activities  either at the KRSJI or in Kosovo. The court is currently set up for delegating the trials of the crimes committed by members of the Kosovo Liberation Army (KLA), an ethnic-Albanian paramilitary organisation which sought the separation of Kosovo from Yugoslavia during the 1990s and the eventual creation of a Greater Albania. The alleged crimes concern the period 1998–2000, during and at the end of the Kosovo war and directed afterwards against "ethnic minorities and political opponents". The court was formally established in 2016. It is separate from other Kosovar institutions, and independent. It is composed of a Specialist Prosecutor's Office and four Specialist Chambers, with themselves comprising Judges' Chambers and a Registry.

In December 2016 Ekaterina Trendafilova was elected first president. Among the people charged with war crimes and crimes against humanity are Kosovo former president Hashim Thaçi and senior Kosovar politician Kadri Veseli. On 15 September 2021 the court's first trial opened, the case against Salih Mustafa.

Background

In 2010, Swiss politician Dick Marty authored a Council of Europe-report in which he noted war crimes had been committed by the KLA. Partly based on that report, the prosecutor of the Special Investigative Taskforce (SITF) of the European Union Rule of Law Mission in Kosovo (EULEX Kosovo) concluded sufficient evidence existed for prosecution of "war crimes, crimes against humanity as well as certain crimes against Kosovan law". The court is located outside Kosovo on request of the prosecutor in order to provide adequate protection to witnesses.

The Kosovo authorities have agreed with the EU on modalities of dealing with those serious allegations. On 3 August 2015, the Kosovo Assembly adopted Article 162 of the Kosovo Constitution and the Law on Specialist Chambers and Specialist Prosecutor's Office, following the Exchange of Letters between the President of Kosovo and the High Representative of the European Union for Foreign Affairs and Security Policy in 2014. The Specialist Chambers are attached to each level of the court system in Kosovo – Basic Court, Court of Appeals, Supreme Court and Constitutional Court. They will function according to relevant Kosovo laws as well as customary international law and international human rights law.

The EU has supported the process from the outset and together with other contributing countries (Canada, Norway, Switzerland, Turkey, and the United States of America) will financially support the work of the court.

The Specialist Chambers comprises two organs, the Chambers and the Registry. The Specialist Prosecutor's Office is an independent office for the investigation and prosecution of the crimes within the jurisdiction of the Specialist Chambers. The Specialist Chambers and the Specialist Prosecutor's Office are staffed with international judges, prosecutors and officers and have a seat in The Hague, the Netherlands.

Legal basis and organisation
Unlike many other non-Dutch judicial institutions in The Hague, the Kosovo Relocated Specialist Judicial Institution isn't an international court, but a court constituted through Kosovan legislation. To provide a proper legal basis for the court, Kosovo's constitution was amended (amendment 24) and Law No.05/L-053 on specialist chambers and specialist prosecutor's office was approved.

The court will be staffed by EU personnel and will have international judges only. The costs of the court will be borne by the EU as part of its Common Foreign and Security Policy. The four specialized chambers are all chambers of corresponding regular Kosovar institutions:
The court of first instance of Pristina
The court of Appeal
Supreme Court
Constitutional Court

Judges
The judges appointed to serve in the Court are:
 Keith Raynor (Vice-President), United Kingdom
 Roland Dekkers (Specialist Chamber of the Constitutional Court), Netherlands
 Anne Power-Forde (Specialist Chamber of the Constitutional Court), Ireland
 Vidar Stensland (Specialist Chamber of the Constitutional Court), Norway
 Antonio Balsamo (Specialist Chamber of the Constitutional Court, Reserve Judge), Italy
 Kai Ambos, Germany
 Michael Bohlander, Germany
 Emilio Gatti, Italy
 Nicolas Guillou, France
 Thomas Laker, Germany
 Guénaël Mettraux, Switzerland
 Vladimir Mikula, Czech Republic
 Andres Parmas, Estonia
 Michèle Picard, France
 Kenneth Roberts, Canada
 Charles Smith III, United States of America
 Mappie Veldt-Foglia, Netherlands
 Christine van den Wyngaert, Belgium

Indicted persons 

A total of eight persons have been indicted in the Kosovo Specialist Chambers. Of those indicted, all have been arrested and transferred to the Chambers' custody. The cases against four persons are in the pre-trial stage, one person is on trial, the case against one person is in the appeals stage, and two persons are serving sentences.

References

 
Judiciary of Kosovo
Organisations based in The Hague
International courts and tribunals
War crimes in the Kosovo War
2017 establishments in the Netherlands